The Ashura Mosque is a mosque in Baku, Azerbaijan. It was founded in 1169 by the master Najaf Ashur son of Ibrahim. It is located in the Asaf Zeynalli Street. The mosque is frequently called the ‘Lezgin Mosque’. The second name of the mosque is connected with the oil boom of the 19th century. As a result of this event a large inflow of labour was observed in Baku, including from Dagestan. This mosque was used by Lezgin workers during religious ceremonies.

The shape of the Ashura Mosque is parallelepiped. There are two small windows on the southern face of the building. The entrance of the mosque is small and arch-shaped which leads to the single chamber prayer room. 

In the year of 1970, the mosque underwent restoration works and after reconstruction archaeological excavations discovered two semicircular arches belongs to the Sassanids period in Azerbaijan. These findings are in the southern part of the mosque building.

See also
 Islam in Azerbaijan
 List of mosques in Azerbaijan

References

Mosques in Baku
Religious buildings and structures completed in 1169
Icherisheher